Richard Norman Everitt (6 December 1978 - 13 August 1994) was a 15-year-old boy who was stabbed to death in London, England, in a racially-motivated attack. Everitt's neighbourhood, Somers Town, had been the site of ethnic tensions. He was murdered by a gang of British Bangladeshis who were seeking revenge against another White British boy. He was not a gang member.

The murderer was not apprehended and members of the gang fled to Bangladesh. Abdul Hai, Badrul Miah and Showat Akbar were tried in 1995. Miah was given a life sentence, with minimum terms of 12 years. Akbar was sentenced to three years in custody for violent disorder. Abdul Hai was acquitted by the jury on the direction of Mrs Justice Steel, the trial judge, at the close of the prosecution case. She ruled that there was no case for him to answer. He left court an innocent man. Abdul Hai was represented by Helena Kennedy QC.

Background
Somers Town, in the London Borough of Camden, was experiencing urban decay in the early 1990s. Many of its white families had been moved onto newer estates, and the ones who remained lived in poverty and unemployment, and felt in conflict with Bengalis. Bengalis were living in the neighbourhood's worst housing, with problems of overcrowding due to their larger-than-average families.

White youths and Bengali youths respectively chose to attend different schools and youth clubs, and interracial relationships were shunned. Hate crimes occurred in the area, with statistics showing that they were predominantly against Bengalis: white locals claimed that this was from exaggerated reports by Bengalis in order to achieve better housing, as well as the police ignoring racial motivations in crimes against white people. Bengalis said that their complaints were going unheard.

Everitt attended South Camden Community School, where the ethnic tensions continued, although he was not involved in them. His mother had previously complained when he was allegedly threatened with a knife by an Asian pupil.

Rosemary Harris, an anthropologist from nearby University College London, researched Somers Town's ethnic unrest in the early 1990s. She documented gangs of white, black and Asian origin, and concluded that the unrest was not caused by external political extremists but rather the playground rivalries of teenagers. She observed a discussion between Everitt's parents and a teacher after he was attacked by a Bangladeshi group, weeks before his murder occurred. Harris said that Camden Council were uninterested in the research when it emerged that the unrest was not solely due to white racism, and said that school staff were fearful of disciplining Bangladeshis.

A local Asian police officer said that the police were hesitant to see Somers Town's gang problem as race-related, and preferred to erroneously consider it motivated by rivalry between different estates.

Victim
Richard Norman Everitt was born on 6 December 1978 in Camden, London to Norman and Mandy Everitt. His family were native to North London and moved to the Somers Town Estate in 1986. Everitt had two older siblings: Daniel and Lucy. His hobbies included building bikes, football, and playing on his Sega Megadrive. In court Everitt was described as "well-liked, very kind and someone who would do anything for anybody".

Murder
On the night of 13 August 1994, Everitt returned from playing football and went to buy food with his friends. They returned with the food in a bag, walking along Midland Road next to St Pancras railway station and then turning onto Brill Place between 21:00 and 22:00. A gang of Asian youths had set off from the Euston area towards Somers Town. The prosecution noted that the gang represented "a danger to any vulnerable white youth whom they happened to encounter". The gang first surrounded a 16-year-old boy on Goldington Street, punched him, pursued him and attempted to stab him in the back, with the victim suffering a small knife wound. One of the gang members was heard to shout "Oi, you cunt, you're going to die". The gang then moved south and then west along Brill Place.

Everitt was with two other white boys on the night of his murder, who were identified in court as PP 9 (aged 14) and MF (aged 17). The Asian gang had initially been walking away from the boys, but upon spotting them they turned around. MF was headbutted by a member of the gang, but managed to run away and escape along with PP. Everitt was caught and stabbed in the back with a seven-inch kitchen knife in his shoulder blades, piercing his heart. His friends notified his parents, who came to him as he was carried into an ambulance. Everitt died at the hospital.

Legal proceedings
During the investigations, a local Asian businessman offered a reward of £1,000 for whoever would name the suspects. Eleven men were arrested and bailed shortly after Everitt was stabbed.

The trial began on 5 October 1995 at the Old Bailey. On 1 November, Badrul Miah was found guilty of conspiring to murder Everitt and was given a life sentence with a minimum of twelve years in prison; Showat Akbar was found guilty of violent disorder and sentenced to three years' youth detention. Their gang had been seeking revenge on a white teenager suspected of stealing their jewellery, and Miah boasted that he had "stabbed up a white boy". Miah and Akbar were deemed by the judge to have been the ringleaders of the attack, but she stated that the identity of the killer was unknown as some of the gang members had fled to Bangladesh.   The judge ruled that there was no case to answer against the third defendant Abdul Hai who subsequently was elected as a councillor in the Borough of Camden.

Groups such as Liberty and the Society of Black Lawyers campaigned for the immediate release of the two convicts, believing that the crime was not racist but the judicial process was. Miah's legal team said that they had been tipped off by a partner of a juror that the jury may have presumed guilt, or found him guilty for murder without knowing that he was old enough to be jailed for life. This appeal was rejected by the Court of Appeal in November 1996 and the European Court of Human Rights in July 1998, as the Contempt of Court Act 1981 means that no details of a jury's deliberation can be disclosed.

In April 2006, Miah was given four days' unsupervised release from HM Prison Blantyre House in Kent to attend his sister's wedding in Sussex. He was released in 2008.

Aftermath
Everitt's murder was received with shock in Somers Town. A Bengali teenager told The Independent that "The boy seems to have had nothing to do with trouble. We are so shocked that Bengali boys could do this. It is the innocent increasingly who are suffering". The Deputy Headmaster of Everitt's school told the press that cohesion was generally good at the school. Jalal Uddin, a Bengali activist, spoke of his fears that revenge attacks could continue perpetually.

A halal butcher's was firebombed, and white gangs attacked Bengalis. Bengalis told family members to stay indoors, and the police increased their presence in order to combat the gangs. A white gang member said that he would not accept support from the British National Party because "the BNP comes down here, gets everyone whipped up and then when the trouble starts we get it and they run away".

After the convictions, Everitt's family were abused by Bengali neighbours, and moved to Essex before settling in northern England. His mother successfully campaigned for stronger sentences for knife crime. In correspondence with the author Michael Collins, she said that "I know it's a terrible thing to say, but I sometimes wish that Richard had been murdered by a white boy. Then we'd have had to deal with the murder but not the nightmare of everything else that followed".

Frank Dobson, the local Labour MP, denied a racial motive and said that suggestions of such would inflame the situation.

The murder was mentioned by India Today as attributable to a decline in values among British Asian youth, who were previously considered a model minority but were becoming increasingly involved with drugs and gangs.

In February 2012, politician Richard Barnbrook (then independent, formerly BNP) raised the issue of Everitt's murder and that of Terry Gregory (2003) in the London Assembly. He questioned why 23 police officers were still investigating the murder of Stephen Lawrence, who was black, yet none were assigned to finding the killers of the aforementioned white teenagers, suggesting there were "hate crime double standards". Mayor Boris Johnson said that both cases were solved and neither were racist. In a follow-up statement the following month, Barnbrook said that only one person had been convicted for Everitt's death (there were actually two) and nobody for Gregory's; Johnson replied that both cases had gone to court and judgement was made on the evidence available.

Memorials and legacy
Diana, Princess of Wales privately laid flowers at the site of Everitt's murder. His funeral took place on 14 October 1994 at St Mary the Virgin Roman Catholic Church.

A memorial plaque paying tribute to Everitt was placed on a wall in Somers Town at the location of his murder. It was later moved to the nearby Purchase Street open space, near Brill Place. A memorial bench was also located at the site, the inscription on it includes the text "Death is nothing at all. I have only slipped away into the next room."

In June 2020, the plaque and bench were moved without prior notification of Everitt's family, as the council-owned land had been sold to private developers. Due to the George Floyd protests, the borough council suggested renaming several properties, and Everitt's older brother petitioned for a council housing tower named after the British colonist Cecil Rhodes to be renamed for Everitt.

In response to Everitt's murder, the KXL Camden United project was founded using football to bring young people together. The team is for players aged 15 to 19.

Socialist Workers Party activist Alan Walter launched Camden Action Now alongside Everitt's parents, offering youth activities and aiming to unite the community.

See also
Murder of Ross Parker – a similar 2001 case in Peterborough
Murder of Kriss Donald – a similar 2004 case in Glasgow

References

1994 in London
1994 murders in the United Kingdom
1990s murders in London
1990s trials
20th century in the London Borough of Camden
Crime in the London Borough of Camden
August 1994 crimes
August 1994 events in the United Kingdom
Deaths by person in London
Incidents of violence against boys
Murder trials
Racially motivated violence against white Europeans
Racially motivated violence in England
Stabbing attacks in London
Trials in London
Violence against children in London